A steam accumulator is an insulated steel pressure tank containing hot water and steam under pressure.  It is a type of energy storage device. It can be used to smooth out peaks and troughs in demand for steam.  Steam accumulators may take on a significance for energy storage in solar thermal energy projects. An example is the PS10 solar power tower plant near Seville, Spain and one planned for the "solar steam train" project in Sacramento, California.

History

It was invented in 1874 by the Scottish engineer Andrew Betts Brown.

Charge
The tank is about half-filled with cold water and steam is blown in from a boiler via a perforated pipe near the bottom of the drum.  Some of the steam condenses and heats the water.  The remainder fills the space above the water level.  When the accumulator is fully charged the condensed steam will have raised the water level in the drum to about three-quarters full and the temperature and pressure will also have risen.

Discharge
Steam can be drawn off as required, either for driving a steam turbine or for process purposes (e.g. in chemical engineering), by opening a steam valve on top of the drum.  The pressure in the drum will fall but the reduced pressure causes more water to boil and the accumulator can go on supplying steam (while gradually reducing pressure and temperature) for some time before it has to be re-charged.

Pressure and temperature
This steam table shows the relationship between pressure and temperature in a boiler or steam accumulator:

 Absolute pressure = gauge pressure + atmospheric pressure

See also

 Fireless locomotive

References

Sources

 Everyman's Encyclopaedia 1931, volume 2, page 543

External links
Steam Accumulators A complete overview of the need for steam storage to meet peak load demands in specific industries, including the design, construction and operation of a steam accumulator, with calculations - Spirax Sarco

Boilers
Energy storage